Jillian Schlesinger is an American filmmaker.  She is known for her documentary Maidentrip about Laura Dekker, the youngest person ever to sail solo around the world.

Early life 
Schlesinger was born in Ossining, New York and moved to Santa Cruz, California as a child. She has an undergraduate degree from Brown University, where she studied creative writing and linguistic anthropology.

Maidentrip 
In 2009, Schlesinger read a New York Times op-ed about a young Dutch woman named Laura Dekker with intentions to sail around the world alone at the age of 14. The story captured her attention and she made an effort to get in touch with Dekker, who was notably media-shy at the time. Dekker responded positively to the idea of a collaboration with the first-time director and the two set off on the adventure of making a documentary together. Working with an all-women crew, Schlesinger met Dekker 10 times over the course of the 17-month voyage around the world, including a three-week passage across the Pacific Ocean on another sailboat. 

After Dekker successfully completed her circumnavigation in January 2012 at the age of 16, it took a year to complete the film, with Dekker visiting New York to work with Schlesinger and editor Penelope Falk. Maidentrip had its world premiere at SXSW Film Festival in March 2013 where it won the Visions Audience Award. The film was subsequently acquired and released by First Run Features.

References

External links
 Official website

Living people
Writers from New York (state)
American film producers
Year of birth missing (living people)
21st-century American writers
21st-century American women writers
American women film producers